Eyad El-Sarraj (27 April 1944 − 17 December 2013) was a Palestinian psychiatrist. He was a consultant to the Palestinian delegation at the Camp David 2000 Summit, a recipient of the Physicians for Human Rights Awards and featured in Army of Roses, a book about Palestinian female suicide bombers by journalist Barbara Victor. In the Palestinian elections of 2006, he headed the Wa'ad list. He died at an Israel hospital, Hadassah Medical Center in Jerusalem

Biography
Eyad El-Sarraj was born in Beersheba, Mandatory Palestine to a Palestinian Arab Muslim family. His family arrived in the Gaza Strip as refugees in 1948.

Sarraj wrote a personal reflection in 1997 about "Why We Have Become Suicide Bombers: Understanding Palestinian Terror" in which he delineated several factors including living "under Israeli occupation." Among other things, he wrote, it means travel restrictions, having an undefined nationality, being asked to spy on your family, dealing with checkpoints, being belittled and seeing the prophet being humiliated.

Sarraj was concerned about the "mental health damage caused by political oppression and challenged both Israeli and Palestinian abuses", having been imprisoned at various times by both Israel and by Yasser Arafat's Palestinian Authority.

On 29 June 2009, El-Sarraj appeared before the United Nations Fact Finding Mission on the Gaza Conflict. He appeared as a witness on behalf of the "Gaza Community Mental Health Programme" stating that 20% of the children in Gaza suffered from posttraumatic stress disorder (PTSD).

The "Gaza Community Mental Health Programme" (GCMHP) was founded by al-Sarraj, and has 40 members on staff.

El-Sarraj was President of Faculty for Israeli-Palestinian Peace International, and a member of many other health organizations.

El-Sarraj was diagnosed with Multiple Myeloma in 2006. He went through Stem Cell Transplantation. Upon a relapse he had in 2013, he sought medical treatment at Hadassah Hospital Medical Center in Israel. He died on 18 December 2013. El-Sarraj was married to Nirmeen Kharma, with whom he had his youngest son Ali. He has two sons from his first marriage, Sayf and Wasseem.

In November 1998 El Sarraj was awarded the Martin Ennals Award for Human Rights Defenders.
El-Sarraj also received the Olof Palme Prize in 2010 for his "self-sacrificing and indefatigable struggle for common sense, reconciliation and peace between Palestine and Israel".

"I am proud and happy to receive this prize, but I consider that the real heroes are the victims of violence, torture and war… This prize gives me hope and encourages me to continue to fight to defend those whose rights have been abused, and to work for justice and peace," El-Sarraj said after receiving the award.

Quotes

"I love my people, I love my home, and I feel a kind of responsibility to help people here. What am I if I live in England and practice psychiatry? There are five thousand, ten thousand, psychiatrists there. Here I can help not just my own people, it is humanity that needs help, this is what brought me back, and this is what will keep me here."

"The Palestinian inner layers of psychology, go around one single issue: the 1948 uprooting and the destruction of their homes. And what the Israelis are doing, by destroying all these homes every day, they are making the Palestinians relive the trauma, which is very deeply buried into our conscious and our unconscious. The home for anybody in the world is a very important base of security, and for the Palestinians who lost their homes, once and sometimes even more than once, it is the most single important issue on the making up of the structure of psychology."

References

1944 births
2013 deaths
Deaths from multiple myeloma
Politicians from Beersheba
Palestinian politicians
Palestinian psychiatrists